The EuroCup Basketball Top Scorer, also known as the EuroCup Basketball Best Scorer, is the annual award that is given to the professional club basketball league EuroCup's Top Scorer throughout the EuroCup season. The EuroCup is the European-wide 2nd-tier level league. It is the European-wide league that is one tier level below the European top-tier level EuroLeague.

EuroCup Basketball Top Scorers

References

External links
EuroCup Basketball official site

EuroCup Basketball
European basketball awards